Léa Linster (born 27 April 1955) is a Luxembourg chef, and a gold medal winner of the 1989 Bocuse d'Or, the first and to date only woman to accomplish this.

Having received a Michelin star in 1987, Linster owns the restaurants Restaurant Léa Linster, Au Quai de la Gare and Kaschthaus, and has been named Maître Cuisinier of Luxembourg, awarded the Gastronomic Golden Key from Gault et Millau in 1996 and the Michele Schumacher Award in 2002.

She appeared in the Saarbrücken edition of the TV series Tatort in 2006 and in the episodes Aus der Traum and Der Tote vom Straßenrand as Linde-Wirtin in 2007. In January and February 2011, she was responsible for the menus served in Lufthansa first and business class.

Léa Linster has a son.

Bibliography

 Einfach und genial. Die Rezepte der Spitzenköchin Lea Linster, 2002
 Best of Léa Linster Cuisinière, 2003
 Rundum genial! Neue Rezepte der Spitzenköchin Lea Linster, 2005
 Kochbuch Lea Linster - Cuisinière, 2006
 Kochen mit Liebe: neue Rezepte der Spitzenköchin Lea Linster, 2007

Awards (selection) 
 1983: Grand Prix Mandarine Napoléon
 1987: First Michelin star
 1987: Maître cuisinier of Luxembourg
 1989: Bocuse d'Or
 1989: Trophée Europe
 1996: Gastronomic Golden Key from Gault et Millau
  2002: Michele Schumacher Award
  2007: Fondation du Mérite Européen

References

External links
Léa Linster official site

1955 births
Living people
Luxembourgian chefs
Women chefs
Head chefs of Michelin starred restaurants